Karl Ballenberger (1801–1860) was a 19th-century German painter who worked in an archaic, medievalising style.

Life
Ballenberger was born at Ansbach on  24 July 1801, the son of a carpenter. He attended a drawing school and worked as decorator in a porcelain factory in Bruckberg, before becoming a stonemason.  In 1831 he moved to Munich, where he was instructed in drawing by Friedrich Hoffstadt, a collector of medieval art who later published  his Gotisches A-B-C Buch with illustrations by himself and Ballenberger. Ballenberger then attended the city's  Academy. During his period in Munich he carved the ornaments on the Gothic tower of the church at Nördlingen, and also painted a stained glass window in the choir there.

In 1833 he moved to Frankfurt am Main with Hoffstadt. There he studied at the Städelsches Kunstinstitut, then under the direction of  the Nazarene painter Philipp Veit. When Veit resigned from the Kunstinstitut, Ballenberger, with a group of other students, followed him to the Deutsche Haus in Sachsenhausen.

Ballenberger made a close study of early German art, and painted in an archaic, medievalising style.  Although his works were hard in drawing and colouring, he achieved considerable success. He was commissioned to paint four portraits, those of  Conrad I, Ludwig of Bavaria, Günther von Schwarzburg and Rupert of the Palatinate, for the Imperial Hall of the "Römer", at Frankfurt. He also painted a large picture for the city of Augsburg, depicting the history of the Reformation there. Other works included series of scenes from legendary, historical, literary or religious subjects, sometimes on canvas or wood, and sometimes in watercolour on paper.

He etched a plate of the arms of artists. His Death of St. Meinrad was engraved by Heinrich Nüsser.

He died at Frankfurt on 21 September 1860.

See also
 List of German painters

References

Sources
 

19th-century German painters
19th-century German male artists
German male painters
1800 births
1860 deaths
People from Ansbach
Academy of Fine Arts, Munich alumni
Burials at Frankfurt Main Cemetery